Pupilla pupula is a species  of minute air-breathing land snail, a  terrestrial pulmonate gastropod mollusc or micromollusc in the family Pupillidae. This species is endemic to the island of Réunion in the Indian Ocean.

References

Endemic fauna of Réunion
Molluscs of Réunion
Pupillidae
Taxonomy articles created by Polbot